The 1923 International Lawn Tennis Challenge was the 18th edition of what is now known as the Davis Cup. For the first time, the competition was split into two zones: the America Zone and the Europe Zone. This change was necessitated by having more than 16 teams compete for the cup (thus not fitting into one easily workable draw). The past several years had also seen a rise in the number of defaults, as teams from around the globe tried to work out the logistics of playing such an international tournament. Regional zones would help alleviate these problems.

The Europe Zone consisted of 13 teams, while the America Zone was made up of 4 teams. Hawaii competed for the first and only time. The winners of the Zones met in an Inter-Zonal play-off, with the winner challenging defending champions the United States for the championship.

Australia defeated France in the Inter-Zonal play-off, but again lost to the United States in the challenge round. The final was played at the West Side Tennis Club in New York City on 31 August – 3 September.

America Zone

Draw

Final
Australia vs. Japan

Europe Zone

Draw

Final
France vs. Spain

Inter-Zonal Final
Australia vs. France

Challenge Round
United States vs. Australia

See also
 1923 Wightman Cup

References

External links
Davis Cup official website

Davis Cups by year
 
International Lawn Tennis Challenge
International Lawn Tennis Challenge
International Lawn Tennis Challenge